Statistics Estonia is the Estonian government agency responsible for producing official statistics regarding Estonia.  It is part of the Ministry of Finance.

The agency has approximately 320 employees. The office of the agency is in Tatari, Tallinn.

Statistics
In November 2018, Statistics Estonia had released a metric of the exports of goods which showed increase by 18% while in December of the same year the industrial producer price index had fallen by .6% in comparison to last month but rose by 1.6%.

According to the Statistics Estonia, it weighed pork production of the country and confirmed that the pork production had decreased from 50,000 tons in 2015 to 38,400 in 2017 as a result of the African swine fever virus. In 2019, Statistics Estonia estimated that there are 1,323,820 people living in the country as of 1 January 2019 which is 4,690 then last year.

See also
Demographics of Estonia
Census in Estonia
2011 Estonia Census
Eurostat

References

External links

Demographics of Estonia
Government agencies of Estonia
Estonia
1990 establishments in Estonia
National statistical services of Europe